George Skene Duff (1816 – 12 March 1889) was a Scottish politician, the son of Sir Alexander Duff.

He served as member of parliament (MP) for Elgin Burghs from 1847 to 1857. He was the younger brother of James Duff, 5th Earl Fife, who sat in Parliament at the same time, representing Banffshire. He was Lord Lieutenant of Elginshire from 1856 until 1872.

References
Oliver & Boyd's new Edinburgh almanac and national repository for the year 1850. Oliver & Boyd, Edinburgh, 1850

External links 
 

1814 births
1889 deaths
Lord-Lieutenants of Elginshire
Members of the Parliament of the United Kingdom for Scottish constituencies
UK MPs 1847–1852
UK MPs 1852–1857